The Train Now Standing is a British sitcom that aired on ITV from 1972 to 1973. Set in a quiet country railway station, the series starred Bill Fraser, known by that point for playing Smudge in the sitcoms The Army Game and Bootsie and Snudge. It was based on the BBC Radio sitcom Parsley Sidings.

Filming
The outdoor scenes for The Train Now Standing were filmed at the then disused Bodiam railway station in East Sussex.

Cast
Bill Fraser – Hedley Green
Hugh Walters – Peter Pringle
Pamela Cundell – Rosie (series 1)
Norman Mitchell – George (series 1)
Bartlett Mullins – Mr Foskins (series 1)
Arthur White – Fred (series 1)
George Waring – Bill (series 1)
Geoff L'Cise – Charlie (series 1)
Denis Lill – Mr Potts (series 1)
Garfield Morgan – Mr Pitts (series 1)
Brenda Peters – Brenda (series 2)
Ken Wynne – Ken (series 2)

Plot
War veteran Hedley Green has been the station master of Burberry Halt railway station for 30 years. It is a quiet, run-down country station on the Milchester line that sees three trains a day. Hedley stills wears the uniform of the Great Western Railway and uses a 1933 rule book. He is assisted by Peter Pringle. Hedley and Peter's time is mostly spent dealing with crises caused by the area manager Mr Potts, who is later replaced by Mr Pitts.

Episodes
Two series of The Train Now Standing aired on ITV. The first series broadcast on Saturdays mostly at 5.10pm and the second on Sundays at 9.30pm. All 15 episodes exist in the archives.

Series One (1972)

Series Two (1973)

References

External links

1970s British sitcoms
1972 British television series debuts
1973 British television series endings
English-language television shows
ITV sitcoms
London Weekend Television shows
1970s British workplace comedy television series